Wolverhampton Grammar School is a co-educational independent school in Wolverhampton, England.

History
Initially a grammar school for boys, WGS was founded in 1512 by Sir Stephen Jenyns, a master of the ancient guild of Merchant Taylors, who was also Lord Mayor of London in the year of Henry VIII's coronation. Jenyns was born in the city of Wolverhampton circa 1448.

In 1875, the school moved to its present site on the Compton Road from its previous site on John Street in the centre of Wolverhampton.

In the late 1970s, the local authority required the school either to become a 6th form centre or a private, fee paying school. The governors decided to go private and the school admitted the first fee paying students in 1978. A bursary appeal was also launched to provide subsidised places.

In September 1984, after 472 years as an all-boys school, the school admitted girls to the sixth form and in other embraces of modernity was the largest single user of assisted places funds, with over 40% of pupils in the 1980s and early 1990s reliant upon assisted places funding.

In September 1992, the school became fully co-educational, admitting girls from the age of 11, a move seen as somewhat controversial at the time; however, other mixed grammar schools had existed for many years previously, while other single sex grammar schools had merged to continue as mixed grammar schools or mixed comprehensives. Unusually, Wolverhampton Girls High School has remained in existence alongside it, pressure for places at that school being eased by girls now being able to attend the grammar school.

The current head, Alex Frazer was appointed in September 2020 and is the 34th Head in the School's 508-year history, replacing Kathy Crewe-Read who is now College Head at Bishop's Stortford College in Hertfordshire.

Over recent years the school has undergone development to improve facilities available to pupils. This included construction of a rock climbing wall, which replaced an Eton Fives court behind the sports centre. A new large extension to the music block was also completed in 2005, and officially opened by Robert Plant. In December 2007, a new block for the arts was opened on Merridale Lane, beyond Moreton's Piece, with a production of As You Like It and an exhibition by artist in residence, Derek Jones. It houses a number of art classrooms on two storeys, a gallery space (The Viner Gallery) and a 150- to 200-seat studio theatre (The Hutton Theatre, named after the late headmaster Patrick Hutton).

In September 2011 Wolverhampton Grammar Junior School (WGJS) was opened on the school site, adding Year 3, 4 and 5. In 2021 the school added Reception, and Years 1 and 2.

The school marked its 500th anniversary in 2012.

Old Wulfrunians

 John Abernethy, surgeon, and founder of the school of medicine at St Bartholomew's Hospital
 Thomas Attwood, founder of the Birmingham Political Union in 1829, which pushed for democratic reform, feted as a hero after the Great Reform Act 1832, later an MP for Birmingham
 Sir Arthur Benson (1907–1987), chief secretary to Central African Council, Governor of North Rhodesia 1954–59
 Sir Norman Brook, 1st Baron Normanbrook (1902–1967), head of the British Civil Service in the late 1950s and 1960s; described by the Oxford Dictionary of National Biography as "the great technician of cabinet government in the mid twentieth century", also chairman of the BBC Board of Governors 1963–67
 Sir William Congreve, 2nd Baronet (1772–1828), inventor and rocket designer
 Robert William Felkin (1853–1926), medical missionary, ceremonial magician and member of the Hermetic Order of the Golden Dawn, author on Uganda and Central Africa, early anthropologist
 Alfred Goldie (1920–2005), professor of pure mathematics at the University of Leeds; author of Goldie's theorem
 Robert Jenrick, Conservative Member of Parliament for Newark (UK Parliament constituency) since 2014 and Treasury Minister in the government of Theresa May
 Chris Kelly, Conservative MP for Dudley South 2010-2015 and benefactor of West Bromwich Albion football club 2021–present
 Mervyn King, Baron King of Lothbury, Governor of the Bank of England, 2003–13
 Augustus Edward Hough Love, mathematician, developer of the theory of Love Waves
 Richard Meddings (born 1958), banker, executive chairman of TSB Bank
 Mark Moore, headmaster of Clifton College
 Ralph Westwood Moore, headmaster of Harrow School
 Jacqui Oatley, first female football commentator on television
 Jon Raven, author of many books related to the Black Country, and folk musician
 John Rentoul, journalist
 Sathnam Sanghera, Times journalist and author
 Roger Squires, crossword compiler
 Sir David Wright, British diplomat, ambassador to Japan, 1996–99

References
 Gerald Poynton Mander, The History of the Wolverhampton Grammar School (Wolverhampton: Steens, 1913)

External links

 WGS Official Site
 Old Wulfrunians Homepage
 Ventrolla - Wolverhampton Grammar School Sash Window Renovation Project

Educational institutions established in the 1510s
Private schools in Wolverhampton
1512 establishments in England
Member schools of the Headmasters' and Headmistresses' Conference